Cooleyhighharmony is the debut studio album by American R&B group Boyz II Men. It was first released in the United States by Motown Records on April 30, 1991. The album was mainly written by Boyz II Men members Nathan Morris, Wanya Morris and Shawn Stockman and extensively produced by Dallas Austin. Cooleyhighharmonys title is a tribute to a real high school in Chicago: Cooley Vocational High School.

The album debuted at number 58 on the US Billboard 200 and eventually peaked at number 3. Its original version produced the US Billboard Hot 100 Top 5 singles, "Motownphilly" and "It's So Hard to Say Goodbye to Yesterday."

Cooleyhighharmony was re-released internationally in 1992 (1993 in the US) with remixes and the inclusion of two hit singles: the worldwide hit single "End of the Road" from the Boomerang soundtrack and "In the Still of the Nite (I'll Remember)" which was initially recorded for the TV mini-series The Jacksons: An American Dream.

Cooleyhighharmony has been certified nine times Platinum by the Recording Industry Association of America (RIAA) for shipments of over 9 million units in the US.

In 2009, a two-disc digitally remastered special edition of the album was released, containing remixes as well as two  previously unreleased songs.

Critical reception

AllMusic editor Andy Kellman rated Cooleyhighharmony four and a half stars out of five. He called the album "a brisk 40-minute set built for front-to-back listening, though the sequencing is more natural with the "adagio" and "allegro" halves switched up. For many of those responsible for its multi-platinum status, it is the album of the early '90s." In a mixed review, Amy Linden from Entertainment Weekly wrote: "Reversing the usual sequence, the album starts with slow jams and saves the faster jams for last, which only serves to highlight how routine the slow stuff is. Don't they know that you start the party kickin', then get down to the grinding?"

Track listing

2009 re-release
In 2009, a two-disc digitally remastered special edition of the album was released by Hip-O Select Records. It contains the 1993 reissue version of the album, plus additional remixes and two previously unreleased tracks.

Personnel
Credits adapted from the liner notes of Cooleyhighharmony.

Technical

 Vida Sparks
 Dallas Austin
 Michael Bivins 
 Jheryl Busby
 Dave Way
 Dennis Mitchell
 Darin Prindle
 Chris Trevett
 Steve Schwartzberg
 Jim "Jiff" Hinger
 Mark Partis

Additional personnel

Mastering: Chris Bellman
Mastering location: Bernie Grundman Mastering
Creative director: Michael Bivins
Art director: Stephen Meltzer
Design: Kaie Wellman
Assistant designer: Elizabeth Matbeny
A&R director: Vida Sparks
Assistant: Darrale Jones
Administrative assistant: Dianne Johnson
Photography: Butch Belaire
Hair and make-up: Helene Andersson
Stylist: Agnes Baddoo

Mixing locations

 Soundworks Studio, New York, NY
 Soundtract Studio, New York, NY
 Doppler Studios, Atlanta, GA

Charts

Weekly charts

Year-end charts

Decade-end charts

Certifications and sales

Release history

See also
List of number-one R&B albums of 1991 (U.S.)

References

1991 debut albums
Albums produced by Dallas Austin
Boyz II Men albums
Motown albums
Albums produced by Troy Taylor (record producer)